Barry Levinson (1932 – October 23, 1987) was an American producer active during the 1970s. He was born in New York City. He died in London, England.

Filmography

 1970 First Love (a.k.a. Erste Liebe) (executive producer)
 1970 The Only Way (producer)
 1972 The Amazing Mr Blunden (producer)
 1973 Catholics (a.k.a. Conflict) (producer)
 1973 Who? (producer)
 1974 The Internecine Project (producer and co-writer)
 1985 Displaced Person for American Playhouse (producer)
 1988 Suspicion for American Playhouse (producer and co-writer)

External links

1932 births
1987 deaths
Film producers from New York (state)
Television producers from New York City
Businesspeople from New York City
20th-century American businesspeople